Zheng Zhiyun (Chinese: 郑致云; ; born 17 February 1995) is a Chinese professional football player of Korean descent who currently plays for as a left-back for Changchun Yatai.

Club career
Zheng Zhiyun joined Genbao Football Academy from Anshan Sports School in 2006. He was promoted to Shanghai SIPG's first team squad in the 2014 season. On 3 May 2016, he made his senior debut in the last group match of 2016 AFC Champions League against Suwon Samsung Bluewings in a 3–0 away defeat, coming on as a substitution for Zhu Zhengrong in the 59th minute. On 18 June 2017, he made his league debut in a 1–1 away draw against Guangzhou R&F as the benefit of the new rule of the league that at least one Under-23 player must be in the starting line-up and was substituted off in the 16th minute. He scored his first senior goal on 3 August 2017, which was the final goal for Shanghai SIPG as part of a 4–0 home victory against Tianjin Quanjian in the second leg of 2017 Chinese FA Cup fifth round, ensuring Shanghai SIPG overcame a three-goal deficit in the competition. At the end of the 2017 season, he went on to make 10 appearances and score once in all competitions.

On 31 January 2018, Zheng was loaned to China League One side Qingdao Huanghai until 31 December 2018. On 11 March 2018, he made his debut for the club in a 4–2 home win over Dalian Transcendence. Zheng was a regular starter for Qingdao, playing 28 league matches out of 30 in the 2018 season.

On 22 February 2019, Zheng transferred to fellow China League One side Shijiazhuang Ever Bright. In his first season with the club he would help the team to a runners-up position and promotion into the top tier.

Career statistics 
Statistics accurate as of match played 31 December 2020.

References

External links
 

1995 births
Living people
Chinese footballers
Footballers from Liaoning
Shanghai Port F.C. players
Qingdao F.C. players
Cangzhou Mighty Lions F.C. players
Chinese Super League players
China League One players
Chinese people of Korean descent
Association football midfielders
Sportspeople from Anshan